Richard William Martini (born November 19, 1955) is a former professional American football player who played wide receiver for four seasons for the Oakland Raiders and one season for the New Orleans Saints. He played on special teams in the Raiders Super Bowl victory against the Philadelphia Eagles in Super Bowl XV. Martini attended UC Davis, where he also excelled in baseball as a centerfielder, and was drafted by the Los Angeles Dodgers and Texas Rangers.

Honors
 He was inducted into the Cal Aggie Athletic Hall of Fame in 1987, the U.C. Davis Baseball Hall of Fame in 2004, and the Ygnacio Valley High School Athletic Hall of Fame in 2016.

References

1955 births
American football wide receivers
Oakland Raiders players
New Orleans Saints players
UC Davis Aggies football players
Living people
Players of American football from Berkeley, California